Dietmar Nöckler (born 29 September 1988) is an Italian cross-country skier. He has been in a relationship with fellow cross-country skier Ilaria Debertolis since 2009.

Nöckler is an athlete of the G.S. Fiamme Oro.

Cross-country skiing results
All results are sourced from the International Ski Federation (FIS).

Olympic Games

World Championships
 2 medals – (1 silver, 1 bronze)

World Cup

Season standings

Team podiums
 3 victories – (1 , 2 ) 
 6 podiums – (2 , 4 )

References

External links
 

1988 births
Living people
Italian male cross-country skiers
Tour de Ski skiers
Cross-country skiers at the 2014 Winter Olympics
Cross-country skiers at the 2018 Winter Olympics
Olympic cross-country skiers of Italy
FIS Nordic World Ski Championships medalists in cross-country skiing
Sportspeople from Bruneck
Germanophone Italian people
Cross-country skiers of Fiamme Oro